This is a list of electoral division results for the Australian 1990 federal election for the Australian Capital Territory and the Northern Territory.
__toc__

Australian Capital Territory

Canberra

Fraser

Northern Territory

Northern Territory

See also 

 Members of the Australian House of Representatives, 1990–1993

References 

Territories 1990